Panama is an electronic musical project from Sydney, Australia. Panama formed after Jarrah McCleary's previous band, The Dirty Secrets came to an end. Panama has allowed McCleary to experiment musically and develop a more electronic, house influenced style.

Panama has seen band members come and go, but is spearheaded by Jarrah McCleary (lead vocals, keyboard, guitar), Tim Commandeur (drums) and Tom Marland (keyboard, guitar). Panama’s second EP Always (2014) nabbed the band spots on BBC Radio 1, Triple J’s iconic Hottest 100 and has had millions of plays on Soundcloud.

The band recorded an EP in Los Angeles and embarked on tours around the world including playing at SXSW in 2014 and Primavera Festival in 2015.

In 2015, Panama partnered with iconic swimwear brand, Seafolly, to featuring the brands latest design’s in the music video for their single, Stay Forever.

In 2020, the EP Always was certified platinum in Australia.

Discography

Extended plays

Singles

As lead artist

As featured artist

References

External links 
 
 
 
 

Musical groups from Sydney
Australian electronic music groups